Mohammed Bello Adoke (born 1 September 1963) is a Nigerian lawyer. He is a Senior Advocate of Nigeria and was appointed Minister for Justice and Attorney-General of the Federation on 6 April 2010, when Acting President Goodluck Jonathan announced his new cabinet.

Early life and career 
Adoke was born on 1 September 1963 in Kogi State. He gained a degree in law from Ahmadu Bello University, Zaria in 1985, and was called to the Nigerian Bar in October 1986.
He also holds a Postgraduate Diploma in International Tax Law from Robert Kennedy University in Zurich, Switzerland and a Diploma in International Commercial Arbitration from Keble College, Oxford.

He held positions with the Kwara State Schools' Management Board, Kano State Ministry of Justice and private law firms before establishing his own practice. He was a member of the Board of Peugeot Automobile from 2006 to 2008 and Chairman of the Board Audit Committee of Unity Bank.
He has acted as an arbitrator in England and Nigeria, handling commercial disputes involving Shell Ultra Deep and the Federal Government of Nigeria, Global Steel Holdings and the Bureau of Public Enterprises Investment, and AES Nigeria Barge and Lagos State Government.

His appointment as Minister of Justice and Attorney General on 6 April 2010 was seen as an attempt by Jonathan to introduce a fresh approach in pushing through electoral reforms. His tenure as Attorney General ended on 29 May 2015.

Malabu oil deal fraud 
On 28 December 2015 Adoke was invited by the Economic and Financial Crimes Commission for questioning over the Malabu Oil deal. He was questioned in connection to the missing £22.5m (N6.18billion) loot of the Sani Abacha which was recovered from Island of Jersey. A threeman team madeup of Federal government officials which including Adoke was setup to monitor and recover the funds. In March 2016 it was reported that Adoke's home in Netherlands was searched as well as the Royal Dutch Shell headquarters due an investigation into the missing funds and receiving bribe from the Malabu Oil deal.

On 21 December 2016, the Economic and Financial Crimes Commission officially filed charges against Adoke on a nine count charge that as at when he was the Attorney General of Nigeria he approved a transfer transaction of $1.1 billion to Nigerian bank accounts managed by Dan Etete former Minister of Petroleum. The $1.1billion was paid by Royal Dutch Shell and Eni to the Federal government account for OPL 245 oil bloc.

On 17 April 2019, a Nigerian High Court in Abuja issued an arrest warrant for Adoke and four others for failing to appear at trial in connection with Malabu Oil deal.

See also
 Nigeria's 155billion naira presidential scam: How Jonathan's associates, ministers shared largesse fairreporters.net

References

1963 births
Living people
Justice ministers of Nigeria
Attorneys General of Nigeria
Ahmadu Bello University alumni
Alumni of Keble College, Oxford
People from Kogi State
Members of the International Law Commission